Bighorn Canyon National Recreation Area is a national recreation area established by an act of Congress on October 15, 1966, following the construction of the Yellowtail Dam by the Bureau of Reclamation. It  straddles the border between Wyoming and Montana.  The dam, named after the famous Crow leader Robert Yellowtail, harnesses the waters of the Bighorn River by turning that variable watercourse into Bighorn Lake.  The lake extends  through Wyoming and Montana,  of which lie within the national recreation area.  About one third of the park unit is located on the Crow Indian Reservation. Nearly one-quarter of the Pryor Mountains Wild Horse Range lies within the Bighorn Canyon National Recreation Area.

Park features
Afterbay Lake, located below Yellowtail Dam, is a popular spot for trout fishing as well as for viewing ducks, geese and other animals. The Bighorn River below the Afterbay Dam is likewise a world-class trout fishing area.  In addition, the area features many archeological and historical resources. Visitor centers and other developed facilities are located in Fort Smith, Montana, and near Lovell, Wyoming.

Bighorn Canyon National Recreation Area has four historic ranches within its boundaries:
 L Slash Heart Ranch was owned by Caroline Lockhart, a notable  journalist and novelist in the early 1900s. Two of her books were made into silent films in the 1920s.
 Mason-Lovell Ranch was operating during the open range days of the 1880s; the ranch once had 25,000 cattle roaming the entire Bighorn Basin.
 Cedarvale Ranch, located in the ghost town of Hillsboro, Montana, was a dude ranch owned by native New Yorker Grosvener W. "Doc" Barry, and attracted people for vacations. Visitors included Doc Barry's friend President Teddy Roosevelt, but attracting other vacationers proved more difficult.
 Ewing-Snell Ranch is a former family ranch started by Erastus Ewing. Ewing went west to get rich in gold mining, but he was not successful in the gold fields and turned to ranching.

North of Lovell along the Sullivan Knob's Trail is one of the national recreation area's more unusual claims to fame. There a visitor can stand in a certain spot on the canyon rim, shout across the canyon and then hear a "triple echo" in reply.

See also

References

Further reading

External links

 
 Archived at Ghostarchive and the Wayback Machine: 

 
1966 establishments in Montana
1966 establishments in Wyoming
Bighorn National Recreation Area
National Park Service areas in Montana
National Park Service areas in Wyoming
National Park Service National Recreation Areas
protected areas established in 1966
protected areas of Big Horn County, Montana
protected areas of Big Horn County, Wyoming
protected areas of Carbon County, Montana